Mineichi (written 峯一) is a masculine Japanese given name. Notable people with the name include:

, Japanese fleet admiral and commander-in-chief of the Imperial Japanese  Navy
, Japanese politician

Japanese masculine given names